In mathematics, in the field of group theory, especially in the study of p-groups and pro-p-groups, the concept of powerful p-groups plays an important role. Powerful p-groups are used in the study of automorphisms of p-groups , the solution of the restricted Burnside problem , the classification of finite p-groups via the coclass conjectures , and provided an excellent method of understanding analytic pro-p-groups .

Formal definition

Properties of powerful p-groups
Powerful p-groups have many properties similar to abelian groups, and thus provide a good basis for studying p-groups.  Every finite p-group can be expressed as a section of a powerful p-group.

Powerful p-groups are also useful in the study of pro-p groups as it provides a simple means for characterising p-adic analytic groups (groups that are manifolds over the p-adic numbers): A finitely generated pro-p group is p-adic analytic if and only if it contains an open normal subgroup that is powerful: this is a special case of a deep result of Michel Lazard (1965).

Some properties similar to abelian p-groups are: if  is a powerful p-group then: 
 The Frattini subgroup  of  has the property 
  for all  That is, the group generated by th powers is precisely the set of th powers.
 If  then  for all 
 The th entry of the lower central series of  has the property  for all 
 Every quotient group of a powerful p-group is powerful.

Some less abelian-like properties are: if  is a powerful p-group then: 
  is powerful.

References
 Lazard, Michel (1965), Groupes analytiques p-adiques, Publ. Math. IHES 26 (1965), 389–603.
 
 

 
 

P-groups
Properties of groups